Dallen Stanford (born May 16, 1979) is a South African-born, former American rugby union sevens player and current rugby commentator based in the United States.

Stanford is a World Rugby lead commentator, having covered the 2019 Rugby World Cup in Japan, the 2018 and 2022 Rugby World Cup Sevens, World Rugby Sevens Series since 2016, World Rugby u20 Championship, Americas Rugby Championship, Rugby Europe Championship, Rugby Europe Super Cup, Super Rugby Americas, Premier Rugby 7s and Major League Rugby on CBS's Sports Network and Fox Sports.

Stanford was selected for the USA Rugby Sevens team by head coach Al Caravelli in 2006. The halfback played in twelve Sevens World Series events from 2007 to 2009 and was a traveling reserve for the 2009 Sevens Rugby World Cup in Dubai.

In November 2014, Stanford received the Athletes in Excellence Award from the Foundation for Global Sports Development, in recognition of his community service efforts and work with youth through Play Rugby USA.

Stanford was the director of sports partnerships for Friends of the British Council, working with Premiership Rugby on their corporate social responsibility program in the USA from 2017 - 2020. One of their initiatives together with USA Rugby was sending nearly 100 coaches for an international rugby coaching experience to Premiership Rugby in England.

Playing and Coaching Career 
Stanford attended Rondebosch Boys' High School and played alongside Springboks Gcobani Bobo and Hanyani Shimange during 1996/1997. He studied Marketing at the Cape Technikon, and played rugby at the University of Cape Town (UCT), captaining the u21A Ikey Tigers side to a rare unbeaten season in 2000. He represented UCT 1st XV from 1999-2002 at outside center, and was part of the 8-8 draw with the University of Stellenbosch (Maties) during the 2002 InterVarsity at Danie Craven Stadium, and UCT's 34-24 win over Stellenbosch in the return fixture at the Green Mile. 
After moving to the United States, Stanford represented the Occidental Olde Boys (2003-2006), Belmont Shore Rugby Football Club (2007-2010), Austin Huns Rugby Football Club (2010-2011) and toured with the Pacific Coast Grizzlies (Hong Kong 10s, Singapore 7s), Atlantis Rugby (Rome 7s, Benidorm 7s) and Tiger Rugby (Nelson Mandela Bay 7s, Cancun 7s, RugbyTown 7s).
At Belmont Shore Rugby Football Club Stanford was a part of the Super League Championship team in 2007 and the USA Rugby Club 7s National Championship side in 2009 and runners-up in 2008 and 2010. Stanford was the tournament's top point scorer at the USA Rugby Club 7s National Championship in 2006.

Stanford represented Team USA at the 2013 World Maccabiah Games in Israel, captaining the USA Rugby squad to Gold in 7s and Bronze in XVs. He was named MVP of the inaugural 7s tournament. In 2015, Stanford represented Team USA as a player/coach at the 13th Pan American Maccabi Games, held in Santiago, Chile. He was one of three USA flag bearers for the Opening Ceremonies. Team USA won Gold in 7s and Silver in XVs, with Stanford captaining the sevens squad.

From 2011 to 2017, Stanford served as the Los Angeles Program Director for non-profit Play Rugby USA - whose mission is developing youth through rugby, using flag rugby as a vehicle for social change. He was the Media manager for USA Rugby at the 2011 Rugby World Cup in New Zealand and 2013 Sevens Rugby World Cup in Russia.

Stanford has coached the Austin Huns RFC, Austin Valkyries, University of Texas at Austin and was Head Coach of the Occidental College Men's RFC from 2011 to 2013. Occidental College claimed their first and only rugby National title in 2013, winning the NSCRO 7s at the Collegiate Rugby Championship in Philadelphia.

Broadcasting career
In 2015/2016 Stanford made his broadcasting debut on the HSBC Sevens World Series announcing the Men's USA 7s (Las Vegas) and Canada 7s (Vancouver) as well as the Women's Atlanta 7s. Stanford has regularly featured on the HSBC Sevens World Series commentating the USA 7s (Las Vegas 2016-2019, Los Angeles 2020 & 2022-2023), Canada 7s (Vancouver 2016-2023), Singapore 7s (2018-2019 & 2023), Dubai 7s (2019 & 2021), Cape Town 7s (2019), Spain 7s (2022), Hong Kong 7s (2022-2023) plus both the 2018 Rugby World Cup Sevens in San Francisco and 2022 Rugby World Cup Sevens in Cape Town. He is one of the leading play-by-play commentators for Major League Rugby in the United States - appearing on CBS Sports Network from 2018 - 2022. Stanford anchored the Fox Sports national television broadcasts for Major League Rugby's season 5, and was the lead voice on the 2022 Shield Final at Red Bull Arena. He was one of the lead commentators for the 2019 World Rugby U20s Championship in Rosario, Argentina, featuring in several video reviews and previews called Commentators Cut.

Stanford made history as the first South African and first American lead commentator to announce a Rugby World Cup for World Rugby on the World Feed. He was one of four lead commentators selected by World Rugby to announce the 2019 Rugby World Cup in Japan. Stanford worked with analyst Joel Stransky and sideline commentator Santiago Gomez-Cora covering 10 pool matches, including: Italy v Namibia, Wales v Georgia, England v USA, Argentina v Tonga, Scotland v Samoa, Ireland v Russia, Japan v Samoa, South Africa v Canada, Ireland v Samoa and Wales v Uruguay. Stanford's most popular Rugby World Cup 2019 commentary included "Kotaro Matsushima - he's so dangerous - Freddy Krueger has nightmares about him!" (Japan v Samoa) and "Cobus Reinach - he's more dangerous than climate change!" (South Africa v Canada). He features on 'Best Commentary from Rugby World Cup 2019".

Stanford was the show host for the Colorado Raptors weekly highlights from 2018 - 2020. 'Pardon My Take' co-host PFT Commentator said in an interview in March, 2020: “I would say that it’s 50 percent the success of the sevens team and 50 percent having Dallen Stanford on all of those calls that make it on social media because he’s an electric dude." 
Since 2015 Stanford has commentated more than 50 Internationals and over 400 International 7s matches.

In 2020, Stanford founded The Rugby Hive with former Canadian 7s international, Robin MacDowell, interviewing current and former international rugby players and coaches.

References 

American people of South African descent
United States international rugby sevens players
Alumni of Rondebosch Boys' High School
1979 births
Living people
South African rugby sevens players